The modern Poland–Russia border is a nearly straight-line division between the Republic of Poland and the Russian Federation exclave Kaliningrad Oblast, a region not connected to the Russian mainland. The current location and length of the border was decided in the aftermath of World War II. In 2004, it became part of the boundary of the European Union and the Commonwealth of Independent States.

History

The history of the border between Poland and Russia can be traced to the early history of both nations, with one of the earliest notable incidents being the Polish king Boleslaw I's intervention in the Kievan succession crisis, 1018. Following the formation of the Polish–Lithuanian Commonwealth, Poland's eastern border, most of it with the Tsardom of Muscovy (later, the Russian Empire), stretched from the Baltic Sea in the north to the Black Sea in the south. Following World War I, the new Second Polish Republic shared a border with the Soviet Union (USSR), shaped during the Polish-Soviet War, and confirmed at the Treaty of Riga at the line Dzisna-Dokshytsy-Słucz-Korets-Ostroh-Zbrucz. Following World War II, the new border (see territorial changes of Poland immediately after World War II) was drawn between the People's Republic of Poland and the USSR.

Modern border
The modern border between Poland and Russia is regulated by a number of legal documents, many of them dating to the times of the People's Republic of Poland and the Soviet Union, including the Border Agreement between Poland and the USSR of 16 August 1945. The newly defined Soviet-Polish border included system of various engineered protection facilities up to a few kilometres wide such as ploughed strips of earth and no-man zone.

While the actual border line remained unchanged following the fall of the Soviet Union, the breakdown of the Soviet Union into a number of post-Soviet states transformed the Poland-Soviet Union border into a Poland-Russia, Poland–Lithuania, Poland-Belarus and Poland-Ukraine border. The Poland–Russia borders were confirmed in a Polish-Russian treaty of 1992 (ratified in 1993).

The Poland–Russia border is 232 km long between Poland and Kaliningrad Oblast of Russia, which is an exclave, unconnected to the rest of Russia due to the Lithuania%E2%80%93Russia border. For most of this length, the Polish side is in the Warmian-Masurian Voivodeship; the extreme east is in the Podlaskie Voivodeship, and the westernmost segment (on the Vistula Spit) in the Pomeranian Voivodeship. 210 km of the border is land and 22 km is sea.

The official demarcation of the boundary was finalized March 5, 1957, in the following terms:

When Poland joined the European Union in 2004, this border became one of the borders between the European Union and the non-EU countries. It is one of the five borders that Russia shares with the EU (see Border of the European Union).

As of 2008, there were three road crossings (Gołdap-Gusev, Bezledy-Bagrationovsk and Gronowo-Mamonovo) and three train crossing (Braniewo-Mamonovo, Skandawa-Zheleznodorozhny and Głomno-Bagrationovsk). In 2010, the largest road crossing up to that point was opened at Grzechotki-Mamonovo. More crossings are being built (Perły-Krylovo, Piaski-Baltiysk, Rapa-Ozyorsk), as the EU standards require Poland to operate at least seven for that border.

In the first quarter of 2012, the Polish-Russian border saw the least traffic out of the borders Poland shares with the non-European Union countries (the others being the Poland-Ukraine border and the Poland-Belarus border). For that period, a majority of the individuals crossing the borders did so for the explicit purpose of short term (usually under one day) shopping; this was the case with 45% of foreigners entering Poland, and 87% of Poles entering Russia. Compared to traffic on other non-EU Polish borders, a much larger percentage (22% foreigners and 7% Poles) crossed the borders for the purpose of tourism and transit (16.5% foreigners).

On November 2, 2022, Poland's Minister of National Defence Mariusz Błaszczak announces the construction of a barrier along the border with the Russian exclave of Kaliningrad, as Poland believes that Russia will use the border to illegally transport African and Asian immigrants to Europe. The move to construct the barrier came in response to Kaliningrad allowing from 1 October for a far greater level of international flights to its airport.

Border area
Because Kaliningrad Oblast is small, homogeneous and an exclave within the European Union, in 2011 the whole Oblast was granted the status of border area eligible to local border traffic rules. In reciprocity, the following Polish administrative districts (powiaty) were granted the same status:
 in the Pomeranian Voivodeship: Puck, Gdynia, Sopot, Gdańsk city and county, Nowy Dwór Gdański, Malbork
 in the Warmian-Masurian Voivodeship: Elbląg city and county, Braniewo, Lidzbark, Bartoszyce, Olsztyn city and county, Kętrzyn, Mrągowo, Węgorzewo, Giżycko, Gołdap, Olecko

The border traffic is very high, and additional border crossings are being considered as of 2013.

Border crossings

See also

Curzon Line
Poland–Russia relations
Polish–Russian Wars
Enclave and exclave

References

 
Kaliningrad Oblast
European Union external borders
Warmian-Masurian Voivodeship
Borders of Poland
Borders of Russia
International borders